The Pecatonica Formation is a geologic formation in Illinois. It preserves fossils dating back to the Ordovician period.

See also
 List of fossiliferous stratigraphic units in Illinois

References

 

Ordovician Iowa
Ordovician Indiana
Ordovician Illinois
Ordovician geology of Wisconsin
Ordovician southern paleotropical deposits